Mathias Perktold (born 17 April 1987) is an Austrian footballer.

References

1987 births
Living people
Association football midfielders
Austrian footballers
Austrian Football Bundesliga players
WSG Tirol players
FC Wacker Innsbruck (2002) players
First Vienna FC players